WMVX may refer to:

 WMVX (AM), a radio station (1110 AM) located in Salem, New Hampshire, United States
 WUBG (AM), a radio station (1570 AM) located in Methuen, Massachusetts, United States, which held the WMVX call sign from 2012 to 2017
 WHLK, a radio station (106.5 FM) located in Cleveland, Ohio, United States, which held the WMVX call sign from 1997 to 2011